Buitrago del Lozoya is a municipality of the autonomous community of Madrid in central Spain. It belongs to the comarca of Sierra Norte. The town is one of the few in the community that have maintained its walls, which are of Moorish origin (11th century) and have been restored in the 15th century. It lies on a peninsula surrounded by the Lozoya river.

Other sights include:
 Buitrago del Lozoya Castle, a Gothic-Mudéjar structure dating from the 15th century, with rectangular plan
 the church of Santa María del Castillo (1321), in the same style
 the Picasso Museum.  This small museum contains works by Pablo Picasso from the collection of Eugenio Arias.  Arias, a barber by profession, came from Buitrago and was a friend of the artist.

Symbol 
The seal and flag that represents the municipality were approved on February 13, 2020.

Weather 
According to the Köppen climate classification, Buitrago del Lozoya has a Csb-type climate (temperate with dry and temperate summer) .

Tourism 
Buitrago has a numeric list of festive, artistic and cultural events, including Belén Viviente and Medieval Fair (Feria Medieval), which are held once every year.

Belén Viviente 
In 1988, a group of residents decided to host the Belén Viviente following an idea that had already been carried out in the Villa de Báscara (province of Gerona), and taking as a model the shepherds that are represented in nearby towns such as Braojos de la Sierra. The first edition of the Belén Viviente involved eighty actors, with four thousand people watching the scenes. 

Given the success from the initiative, in 1991, the Buitrago del Lozoya Living Belén Cultural Association (la Asociación Cultural Belén viviente de Buitrago del Lozoya) was founded. The number of actors joining the Belén Viviente increased to over 100. The Belén Viviente attracted over 10,000 visitors.

In Currently, the el Belén Viviente in Buitrago del Lozoya (el Belén viviente de Buitrago del Lozoya) is one of the most important event in Spain, with 39 scenes spread across a 1,300-meter route with over 200 actors, 15 technicians and 35 security officiers joining the event. Acting as a cultural event, it has attracted over 25,000 visitors to Buitrago del Lozoya every year.

Medieval Fair (Feria Medieval) 
Since 2001, the Medieval Fair is held in Buitrago del Lozoya on the first weekend of September every year. Given the great feedback received since its first edition (attracting over 30,000 visitors every year), it has become one of the most important event in the Community of Madrid. 

During the three-day period, Buitrago travels back to the Middle Ages. The fair includes a large market with over 100 stalls in addition to numerous activities like theater, music, dance and parade.

Public Transportation 
Buitrago has 12 bus lines, two of them heading to the Plaza de Castilla. Except for line 911 and 912, all lines are operated by ALSA. Line 911 and 912 are operated by the Sierra City Council. 

Line 191: Madrid (Plaza de Castilla)-Buitrago

Line 191A: Buitrago-Braojos

Line 191B: Buitrago-Somosierra

Line 191C: Buitrago-Montejo de la Sierra

Line 191D: Buitrago-Robledillo de la Jara
  
Line 191E: Buitrago-Cervera de Buitrago

Line 194A: Buitrago-Lozoyuela-Rascafría

Line 195A: Buitrago-Lozoyuela (by Gargantilla)

Line 195B: Buitrago-Gargantilla

Line 196: Madrid (Plaza de Castilla)-La Acebeda

Line 911: Buitrago-Montejo-La Hiruela

Line 912: Buitrago-Montejo-Puebla de la Sierra

References

External links

More in-depth article on Spanish Wikipedia

Municipalities in the Community of Madrid